Merlin Lee Nippert (born September 1, 1938) is a retired American professional baseball player. A relief pitcher, he appeared briefly in Major League Baseball for the Boston Red Sox during the final weeks of the  season.

Nippert attended the University of Central Oklahoma and Oklahoma State University and signed with the Red Sox in 1957. By 1962, he had risen to the Triple-A Seattle Rainiers of the Pacific Coast League, where he excelled coming out of the bullpen: he won eight of 12 decisions and posted a 2.00 earned run average in 58 games pitched, all in relief. Seattle fans nicknamed him "Merlin the Magician".

The parent Red Sox recalled him in September for four relief appearances. Nippert allowed three earned runs and four hits, giving up four walks and striking out three in six full innings pitched for a 4.50 ERA. He did not have a decision or a save.

See also
1962 Boston Red Sox season

References

External links

1938 births
Living people
Ardmore Rosebuds players
Baseball players from Oklahoma
Boston Red Sox players
Corning Red Sox players
Greensboro Patriots players
Major League Baseball pitchers
Oklahoma State Cowboys baseball players
People from Mangum, Oklahoma
Raleigh Capitals players
Seattle Rainiers players
Victoria Rosebuds players
Central Oklahoma Bronchos baseball players